The Detroit Titans were the college football team which represented the University of Detroit (now University of Detroit Mercy) from 1896 to 1964. Under head coach Gus Dorais in 1928, the Titans won all nine of their games. Several years later Parke H. Davis, considered to be a "major selector" by the NCAA, named the 1928 team to a share of the national championship.

From 1922 on, the Titans played their home games at University of Detroit Stadium (also known as U of D Stadium, Titan Stadium, and Dinan Field) near McNichols Road (Six Mile Road) and Fairfield Street on the university's McNichols campus. The football program had incurred large losses since 1951, and was discontinued after the 1964 season. University president Rev. Laurence V. Britt stated that the institution "does not currently have and does not foresee any prospects of its having the substantial funds" required to continue the program.

Conference affiliations
Detroit was both independent and affiliated with the Missouri Valley Conference.
 Unknown (1896–) 
 Independent (–1947)
 Missouri Valley Conference (1948–1956)
 Independent (1957–1964)

Championships

National championships
Detroit won its only national championship in 1928, with Parke H. Davis selecting both Detroit and Georgia Tech. The school claims this championship.

Head coaches

Notable personnel

Players in the NFL Draft

References

External links
 University of Detroit Football Collection

 
American football teams established in 1892
American football teams disestablished in 1964
1892 establishments in Michigan
1964 disestablishments in Michigan